Jean-Pierre Vincent (26 August 1942 – 5 November 2020) was a French theatrical actor and director.

He served as Administrator of the Comédie-Française from 1983 to 1986.

Theatre
The Broken Jug (1963)
Scènes populaires (1963)
A Respectable Wedding (1968)
Tambours et trompettes (1969)
Les Acteurs de bonne foi (1970)
Le Marquis de Montefosco (1970)
La Cagnotte (1971)
Capitaine Schelle, Capitaine Eçço (1971)
Le Camp du drap d'or (1971)
La Vie scélérate du noble seigneur Gilles de Rais (1971)
In the Jungle of Cities (1972)
Woyzeck (1973)
A Respectable Wedding (1973)
En r'venant de l'expo (1973)
The Mother (1975)
Germinal, projet sur un roman (1975)
La Bonne Vie (1976)
Don Giovanni (1976)
The Misathrope (1977)
Une livre à vue et Palais de la guérison (1978)
La Mort d'Andrea Del Sarto, peintre florentin (1978)
Vichy-Fictions et Violences à Vichy (1980)
Convoi et Ruines (1980)
Love's Labour's Lost (1980)
Don Giovanni (1981)
Palais de Justice (1981)
Les Corbeaux (1982)
Dernières Nouvelles de la peste (1983)
Félicité (1983)
The Suicide (1984)
The Misanthrope (1984)
Macbeth (1985)
Six Characters in Search of an Author (1985)
The Marriage of Figaro (1985)
On ne badine pas avec l'amour (1988)
Le Faiseur de théâtre (1988)
Scènes du répertoire Büchner - Courteline (1988)
La Nuit les chats (1989)
Oedipus Rex (1989)
Assainissement (1990)
The Guilty Mother (1990)
Le Chant du départ (1990)
Scapin the Schemer (1990)
Princesses (1991)
Fantasio (1991)
The Moods of Marianne (1991)
Un homme pressé (1992)
On ne badine pas avec l'amour (1993)
Il ne faut jurer de rien (1993)
Woyzeck (1993)
Thyestes (1994)
The Marriage of Figaro (1994)
Violences à Vichy 2 (1995)
All's Well That Ends Well (1996)
Léo Burckart (1996)
Karl Marx Théâtre inédit (1997)
The Game of Love and Chance (1998)
Tartuffe (1998)
Pièces de guerre (1999)
Man Equals Man (2000)
Mitridate, re di Ponto (2000)
Lorenzaccio (2000)
Le Drame de la vie (2001)
L’Échange (2001)
Les Prétendants (2002)
Le Fou et sa femme, ce soir, dans Pancomedia (2002)
Katherine Barker (2002)
Onze Débardeurs (2003)
Derniers remords avant l'oubli (2004)
Danton's Death (2004)
Antilopes (2006)
L’Éclipse du 11 août (2006)
Oresteia (2006)
Le Silence des communistes (2007)
The School for Wives (2008)
Silence des communistes (2008)
Ubu Roi (2008)
Paroles d'acteurs / Meeting Massera (2009)
La Trilogie de Zelinda & Lindoro (2010)
Les Acteurs de bonne foi (2010)
Cancrelat (2012)
Dom Juan (2012)
Iphis et Iante (2013)
Les Suppliantes (2013)
War & Breakfast (2014)
La Dame aux jambes d'Azur (2015)
En attendant Godot (2015)

Awards
Prix du syndicat de la Critique for Capitaine Schelle, Capitaine Eçço (1972)
Prix du syndicat de la Critique pour l'ensemble (1976)
Prix Dominique for Vichy-Fictions (1979)
Prix Georges Lherminier for Vichy-Fictions (1980)
Prix du Syndicat de la Critique for Palais de Justice (1982)
Molière Award for Best Director for Le Mariage de Figaro (1987)
Grand Prix du Syndicat de la Critique for Le Mariage de Figaro (1987)
Prix du syndicat de la Critique for Princesses (1991)
Prix du syndicat de la Critique for Les Prétendants (2003)
Prix Plaisir du théâtre for Les acteurs de bonne foi (2011)

References

1942 births
2020 deaths
20th-century French actors
21st-century French actors
French male stage actors
French directors
Deaths from the COVID-19 pandemic in France